There are 302 species of cnidarians (phylum Cnidaria) recorded in Ireland.

The cnidarians' distinguishing feature is cnidocytes, specialized cells that they use mainly for capturing prey. Their bodies consist of mesoglea, a non-living jelly-like substance, sandwiched between two layers of epithelium that are mostly one cell thick. They have two basic body forms: swimming medusae and sessile polyps, both of which are radially symmetrical with mouths surrounded by tentacles that bear cnidocytes. Both forms have a single orifice and body cavity that are used for digestion and respiration. Many cnidarian species produce colonies that are single organisms composed of medusa-like or polyp-like zooids, or both (hence they are trimorphic).

Cnidarians found in Ireland and Irish waters include sea pens, sea anemones, hydroids, sea jellies ("jellyfish") and corals.

Class Anthozoa

Order Actiniaria (sea anemones)

Family Actiniidae

Actinia equina (beadlet anemone)
Actinia fragacea (strawberry anemone)
Anemonia viridis (snakelocks anemone)
Anthopleura ballii (red speckled anemone)
Aulactinia verrucosa (gem anemone)
Urticina eques  
Urticina felina (northern red anemones, dahlia anemone)

Family Actinostolidae

Stomphia coccinea

Family Aiptasiidae

Aiptasia mutabilis

Family Capneidae

Capnea sanguinea

Family Edwardsiidae

Edwardsia claparedii
Edwardsia delapiae 
Edwardsia timida (timid burrowing anemone)
Edwardsiella carnea
Scolanthus callimorphus

Family Gonactiniidae

Gonactinia prolifera

Family Halcampidae

Halcampa chrysanthellum

Family Halcampoididae

Halcampoides elongatus

Family Haloclavidae

Mesacmaea mitchellii
Peachia cylindrica

Family Hormathiidae

Adamsia carciniopados
Adamsia palliata (cloak anemone)
Calliactis parasitica
Cataphellia brodricii
Hormathia coronata

Family Metridiidae

Metridium senile (plumose anemone, frilled anemone)

Family Sagartiidae

Actinothoe sphyrodeta
Cereus pedunculatus (daisy anemone)
Phellia gausapata
Sagartia elegans
Sagartia ornata
Sagartia troglodytes (mud sagartia, cave-dwelling anemone)
Sagartiogeton laceratus
Sagartiogeton undatus

Order Alcyonacea (soft corals)

Family Alcyoniidae

Alcyonium digitatum (dead man's fingers)
Alcyonium glomeratum (red sea fingers)
Alcyonium hibernicum (pink sea fingers)
Parerythropodium coralloides

Family Gorgoniidae

Eunicella verrucosa (broad sea fan, pink sea fan, warty gorgonian)

Family Plexauridae

Swiftia pallida (northern sea fan)

Order Ceriantharia (tube-dwelling anemone)

Family Arachnactidae

Arachnanthus sarsi

Family Cerianthidae

Cerianthus lloydii (lesser cylinder anemone)
Pachycerianthus multiplicatus (firework anemone)

Order Corallimorpharia

Family Corallimorphidae

Corynactis viridis

Order Pennatulacea (sea pens)

Family Virgulariidae

Virgularia mirabilis

Order Zoantharia

Family Epizoanthidae

Epizoanthus couchii

Family Parazoanthidae

Isozoanthus sulcatus  
Parazoanthus anguicomus  
Parazoanthus axinellae  (yellow cluster anemone)

Class Hydrozoa

Order Anthoathecata (athecate hydroids)

Family Bougainvilliidae

Bougainvillia muscus
Garveia nutans

Family Candelabridae

Candelabrum phrygium

Family Corymorphidae

Corymorpha nutans

Family Corynidae

Coryne eximia
Coryne muscoides
Sarsia densa

Family Eudendriidae

Eudendrium annulatum
Eudendrium arbuscula
Eudendrium ramosum

Family Hydractiniidae

Clava multicornis
Hydractinia echinata (snail fur)

Family Hydridae (hydras)

Hydra viridissima (green hydra)
Hydra vulgaris (common hydra)

Family Pandeiidae

Leuckartiara octona
Neoturris pileata

Family Porpitidae (chondrophores)

Velella velella (sea raft, by-the-wind sailor, purple sail, little sail)

Family Tubulariidae

Ectopleura larynx
Tubularia indivisa (oaten pipes hydroid)

Order Leptomedusae (thecate hydroids)

Family Aequoreidae

Aequorea forskalea
Aequorea vitrina

Family Aglaopheniidae

Aglaophenia acacia
Aglaophenia kirchenpaueri
Aglaophenia pluma (toothed feather hydroid, podded hydroid)
Aglaophenia tubiformis
Aglaophenia tubulifera
Gymnangium montagui
Lytocarpia myriophyllum

Family Campanulariidae

Campanularia hincksii
Clytia hemisphaerica
Laomedea angulata
Laomedea flexuosa
Obelia dichotoma
Obelia geniculata
Obelia longissima
Obelia plicata
Rhizocaulus verticillatus

Family Haleciidae

Halecium beanii
Halecium halecinum
Halecium muricatum
Halecium plumosum

Family Halopterididae

Antennella secundaria 
Halopteris catharina
Schizotricha frutescens

Family Kirchenpaueriidae

Kirchenpaueria pinnata

Family Lafoeidae

Lafoea dumosa

Family Plumulariidae

Nemertesia antennina
Nemertesia ramosa
Plumularia argentea
Plumularia cupressina
Plumularia distans
Plumularia setacea (plumed hydroid, little sea bristle)
Polyplumaria flabellata

Family Sertulariidae

Abietinaria abietina
Abietinaria filicula
Amphisbetia operculata
Diphasia alata
Diphasia attenuata
Diphasia fallax
Diphasia nigra
Diphasia pinaster
Diphasia rosacea
Dynamena pumila
Hydrallmania falcata
Sertularella fusiformis
Sertularella gayi
Sertularella mediterranea
Sertularella polyzonias
Sertularella rugosa
Tamarisca tamarisca
Thuiaria articulata (jointed hydroid)
Thuiaria thuja

Order Limnomedusae

Family Olindiidae

Craspedacusta sowerbii

Order Siphonophorae (siphonophores)

Family Apolemiidae

Apolemia uvaria (string jellyfish, barbed wire jellyfish, long stringy stingy thingy)

Family Physaliidae

Physalia physalis (Portuguese man-o'-war, blue bottle, floating terror)

Class Scyphozoa (true sea jellies)

Order Rhizostomae

Family Rhizostomatidae

Rhizostoma pulmo (barrel jelly, dustbin-lid jelly, frilly-mouthed jelly)

Order Semaeostomeae (flag-mouth sea jellies)

Family Cyaneidae

Cyanea capillata (lion's mane jelly)
Cyanea lamarckii (blue jelly, bluefire)

Family Pelagiidae

Chrysaora hysoscella (compass jelly)
Pelagia noctiluca (mauve stinger)

Family Ulmaridae

Aurelia aurita (moon jelly, common jelly, saucer jelly)

Order Scleractinia (stony corals, hard corals)

Family Caryophylliidae

Caryophyllia inornata
Caryophyllia smithii (Devonshire cup coral)
Lophelia pertusa

Family Oculinidae

Madrepora oculata (zigzag coral)

Class Staurozoa

Order Stauromedusae (stalked jellies)

Family Craterolophidae

Craterolophus convolvulus

Family Kishinouyeidae

Lucernariopsis campanulata

Family Lucernariidae

Haliclystus auricula (kaleidoscope jelly)

References

 World Register of Marine Species

External links
Marine species identification portal

Ireland
Cnidarians
Ireland
Cnidarians